CSP may refer to:

Education
 College Student Personnel, an academic discipline
 Commonwealth Supported Place, a category in Australian education
 Concordia University (Saint Paul, Minnesota), US

Organizations
 Caledonian Steam Packet Company, Scotland
 California Society of Printmakers, US
Cambridge Scholars Publishing, UK
 Canadian Ski Patrol
 Center for Security Policy, a think tank in Washington, D.C., US
 Chartered Society of Physiotherapy, UK
 Paulist Fathers or the Congregation of St. Paul

Government
 California State Police, US
 Civil Services of Pakistan
 Colorado State Patrol, US
 Committee of Public Safety, France (1793-95)
 Connecticut State Police, US

Political parties
 Chicago Socialist Party, US
 Christian Social Party (disambiguation)
 Christian Solidarity Party, Ireland
 Christlich Soziale Partei (Belgium)
 Congress Socialist Party, India

Transportation
 Camas Prairie Railroad, Idaho, US
 Camas Prairie RailNet, shortline railroad formerly owned by North American RailNet, US
 Casper Air Service (ICAO airline designator)

Science and technology
 Chiral stationary phase, in chiral column chromatography
 Concentrated solar power, a type of design for electricity generation and water warming
 Crystal structure prediction
 Cavum septi pellucidi, a common variation observed in brain anatomy
 Compulsive skin picking
 Chemosensory protein
 Cyclic sieving phenomenon, in combinatorics and representation theory
 Circumsporozoite protein

Computing
 Credential service provider, a trusted entity
 Common spatial pattern, in signal processing and statistical data analysis
 Carriage service provider
 Chip-scale package, or chip-size package
 Client-side prediction, a network programming technique in video games
 Communicating sequential processes, a formal language for describing patterns of interaction in concurrent systems
 Communications service provider, for example telecommunications
 Constraint satisfaction problem, a formalism for defining constrained decision problems 
 Content Security Policy, a security standard introduced to prevent certain kinds of cross-site scripting-based attacks
 Control Storage Processor, a processor architecture used in the IBM System/32, IBM System/34 and IBM System/36 computers.
 Critical security parameter, in cryptography
 IBM Cross System Product, a defunct 4GL for IBM mainframes
 Cryptographic Service Provider, in Microsoft Windows
 Cubesat Space Protocol, a small network-layer delivery protocol for cubesats
 Cloud service provider
 Clip Studio Paint, digital art software

Other uses
 Centro Sportivo Paraibano, Brazilian football (soccer) club
 Certified Scrum Professional, a certification for Scrum Agile Project Management
 Certified Safety Professional, an accredited status in the United States
 Certified Speaking Professional, an accredited status in the US
 Club Sportivo Patria, Argentinian football club
 Conservation Security Program, a voluntary agricultural land conservation program in the US
 Corporate sustainable profitability
 Council Shoulder Patch, insignia of the Boy Scouts of America
 Limoges CSP, a French basketball club

See also
 List of California state parks